I Am Yours may refer to:

Songs
 "I Am Yours" (song), by The Makemakes, 2015
 "I Am Yours", by the Adicts from Fifth Overture
 "I Am Yours", by the Afters from Light Up the Sky
 "I Am Yours", by Andy Grammer from Naive
 "I Am Yours", by Bethany Dillon from Stop & Listen
 "I Am Yours", by Catphish from Guaranteed
 "I Am Yours", by Darrell Evans from You Are I AM
 "I Am Yours", by Derek and the Dominos from Layla and Other Assorted Love Songs
 "I Am Yours", by Jeff Deyo from Light
 "I Am Yours", by Lauren Daigle from How Can It Be
 "I Am Yours", by the Main Ingredient from Afrodisiac
 "I Am Yours", by Matt Redman from Intimacy
 "I Am Yours", by Melanie Laine from Time Flies
 "I Am Yours", by Michael Gungor from Bigger Than My Imagination
 "I Am Yours", by Scarlet White from The Inbetween
 "I Am Yours", by Tracy Chapman from Let It Rain

Other uses
 I Am... Yours, the first residency show by American singer Beyoncé
 I Am... Yours: An Intimate Performance at Wynn Las Vegas, a 2009 album by Beyoncé
 I Am Yours (film), a 2013 Norwegian drama film written and directed by Iram Haq

See also
 I'm Yours (disambiguation)
 I Am You (disambiguation)